COTAIR - an acronym for Côte Atlantique Inter Régional - was an airline based in Cotonou, Benin. It was established in 2008 and operated scheduled domestic flights in Benin and non-scheduled regional charter flights in West Africa. Its main base was Cotonou Cadjehoun Airport (COO). COTAIR ceased operations on 31 December 2009

Destinations
COTAIR operated domestic services from Cotonou to Parakou. Additionally it offered on-demand charter-flights throughout western Africa.

COTAIR was on the list of air carriers banned from operating within the European Union.

Fleet
The COTAIR fleet consisted of the following aircraft (as of 20 June 2010):
2 Let L-410 UVP

See also		
 List of defunct airlines of Benin

References

External links
COTAIR official website  
COTAIR Let L-410 UVP (TY-TBG) on planes.cz 

Defunct airlines of Benin
Airlines established in 2008
Airlines disestablished in 2009
2008 establishments in Benin
Companies based in Cotonou